The Haskins Award is presented annually by the Haskins Commission to honor the most outstanding collegiate golfer in the United States. The award is named in memory of Fred Haskins, former golf teaching professional at the Country Club of Columbus (Georgia). Votes are tabulated by the Haskins Commission from select writers, golf coaches, and collegiate golfers. It is college golf's equivalent to college football's Heisman Trophy.

Winners

See also
Ben Hogan Award

References

External links

Golf awards in the United States
College golf in the United States
College sports trophies and awards in the United States